Eutassa fuscicollis is a beetle in the Curculionidae family. It was first described by Thomas Broun in 1909, and is endemic to New Zealand

Description
Broun describes it from a male specimen collected on the Waitakerei Range:

References

Curculionidae
Insects described in 1909
Taxa named by Thomas Broun